Maria Luisa Gorno-Tempini is an Italian behavioral neurologist and neuroscientist and a leading expert in frontotemporal dementia. She directs the ALBA Lab of the University of California, San Francisco Memory and Aging Center. She is also the co-director of the UCSF Dyslexia Center.

Biography
Gorno-Tempini obtained her medical degree (University of Brescia, 1993) and clinical specialization in neurology (University of Modena and Reggio Emilia, 1998) in Italy. To pursue her research interest, she worked for three years at the Function Imaging Laboratory, University College London, where she obtained her Ph.D. degree (2001). As member of the language group, she conducted positron emission tomography and functional MRI studies investigating the neural basis of face and proper name processing. In 2001, Gorno-Tempini began her work at the Memory and Aging Center as a clinical fellow. She has since become a full professor.

Clinical and research areas
Gorno-Tempini’s main focus is in behavioral neurology, particularly the neural substrate of language and memory. She deploys behavioral and neuroimaging paradigms to the study of neurodegenerative disease, in particular primary progressive aphasia and frontotemporal dementia. Gorno-Tempini has had mentees from diverse backgrounds (e.g., residents, pre-doctoral and post-doctoral fellows, and faculty-level individuals) and has taught them clinical neurology, basic neuroscience, research methodology, manuscript preparation and grant writing. She advocates for international scientific collaboration.

References/Notes and references

External links
UCSF Profile
ALBALab Profile
Neurotree

Living people
Italian neuroscientists
Italian women neuroscientists
Italian neurologists
Year of birth missing (living people)